In geometry, a diameter of a circle is any straight line segment that passes through the center of the circle and whose endpoints lie on the circle. It can also be defined as the longest chord of the circle. Both definitions are also valid for the diameter of a sphere.

In more modern usage, the length  of a diameter is also called the diameter. In this sense one speaks of  diameter rather than  diameter (which refers to the line segment itself), because all diameters of a circle or sphere have the same length, this being twice the radius 

Both quantities can be calculated efficiently using rotating calipers. For a curve of constant width such as the Reuleaux triangle, the width and diameter are the same because all such pairs of parallel tangent lines have the same distance.

For an ellipse, the standard terminology is different. A diameter of an ellipse is any chord passing through the centre of the ellipse. For example, conjugate diameters have the property that a tangent line to the ellipse at the endpoint of one diameter is parallel to the conjugate diameter. The longest diameter is called the major axis.

It is often abbreviated  or

Generalizations 

The definitions given above are only valid for circles, spheres and convex shapes. However, they are special cases of a more general definition that is valid for any kind of -dimensional (convex or non-convex) object, such as a hypercube or a set of scattered points. Explicitly, if  is the subset and if  is the metric, the diameter is

If the metric  is viewed here as having codomain  (the set of all real numbers), this implies that the diameter of the empty set (the case ) equals  (negative infinity).

For any solid object or set of scattered points in -dimensional Euclidean space, the diameter of the object or set is the same as the diameter of its convex hull. In medical parlance concerning a lesion or in geology concerning a rock, the diameter of an object is the least upper bound of the set of all distances between pairs of points in the object.

In differential geometry, the diameter is an important global Riemannian invariant.

In planar geometry, a diameter of a conic section is typically defined as any chord which passes through the conic's centre; such diameters are not necessarily of uniform length, except in the case of the circle, which has eccentricity

Symbol 

The symbol or variable for diameter, is sometimes used in technical drawings or specifications as a prefix or suffix for a number (e.g. "⌀ 55 mm"), indicating that it represents diameter. For example, photographic filter thread sizes are often denoted in this way.

In German, the diameter symbol (German Durchmesserzeichen) is also used as an average symbol (Durchschnittszeichen).

Similar symbols 

The Latin small letter o with stroke  is similar in size and design to this. The diameter symbol ⌀ is distinct from the empty set symbol , from an (italic) uppercase phi , and from the Nordic vowel  (Latin capital letter O with stroke). See also slashed zero.

Encodings 

On an Apple Macintosh, the diameter symbol can be entered via the character palette (this is opened by pressing  in most applications), where it can be found in the Technical Symbols category. In Unix/Linux/ChromeOS systems, it is generated using  . It can be obtained in Unix-like operating systems using a Compose key by pressing, in sequence, . In Windows, it can be entered in most programs with Alt code 8960.

The character will sometimes not display correctly, however, since many fonts do not include it. In many situations, the Nordic letter ø at Unicode  is an acceptable substitute. It can be entered on a Macintosh by pressing  (the letter o, not the number 0). AutoCAD uses  available as a shortcut string .

In Microsoft Word, the diameter symbol can be acquired by typing  and then pressing .

In LaTeX, the diameter symbol can be obtained with the command \diameter from the "wasysym" package.

Diameter vs. radius 
The diameter of a circle is exactly twice its radius. However, this is true only for a circle, and only in the Euclidean metric. The page on Jung's theorem discusses some more general inequalities relating the diameter to the radius.

See also 

 
 Caliper, micrometer, tools for measuring diameters
 
 , a concept in group theory
 Eratosthenes, who calculated the diameter of the Earth around 240 BC.
 
 
 * 
 
 
 The diameters of a screwthread

References 

Elementary geometry
Length
Circles